Extensive may refer to:

 Extensive property
 Extensive function
 Extensional

See also 
 Extension (disambiguation)